Cosmisoma lineatum is a species of beetle in the family Cerambycidae. It was described by Theodor Franz Wilhelm Kirsch in 1875.

References

Cosmisoma
Beetles described in 1875